The 1978–79 Romanian Hockey League season was the 49th season of the Romanian Hockey League. Six teams participated in the league, and Dinamo Bucuresti won the championship.

Regular season

External links
hochei.net

Romania
Romanian Hockey League seasons
Rom